The 1998 Boise State Broncos football team represented Boise State University in the 1998 NCAA Division I-A football season. The Broncos competed in the Big West Conference and played their home games on campus at Bronco Stadium in Boise, Idaho.

Schedule

Source:

References

Boise State
Boise State Broncos football seasons
Boise State Broncos football